Lucas Miguel Sánchez (born 17 May 1992) is an Argentine footballer who plays as a defender. He is currently a free agent.

Career
Sánchez's senior career began with Gimnasia y Esgrima in Torneo Argentino B, featuring in four fixtures for the club in 2010. A year later, Sánchez completed a move to Primera B Metropolitana side Almagro. He made one appearance for them in 2011–12, which was his professional debut.

Career statistics
.

References

External links

1992 births
Living people
Place of birth missing (living people)
Argentine footballers
Association football defenders
Torneo Argentino B players
Primera B Metropolitana players
Gimnasia y Esgrima de Mendoza footballers
Club Almagro players